Stephanie Anna Charlotte Buhl-Freifrau von und zu Guttenberg (née Gräfin von Bismarck-Schönhausen; 24 November 1976 in Munich) is a German activist against child abuse, and the former president of the German section of , a human rights NGO working to protect the rights of children on the Internet and working to restrict the spread of child pornography, and a co-author of a book about these topics.

She is the wife of Karl-Theodor zu Guttenberg, the former German Minister of Defence, who had to resign due to a scandal, the whole family moved to America from Germany to escape the scandal.  A member of the Bismarck family, she is the great-great-granddaughter of Chancellor Otto, Prince of Bismarck, and great-granddaughter of Foreign Secretary Herbert, Prince of Bismarck. She is also a descendant of Robert Whitehead, the inventor of the torpedo, through her grandfather, the Austrian diplomat Alexander, Count of Hoyos. Through her grandmother Edmée de Loys-Chandieu (1892–1945), wife of Alexander Hoyos, she is a descendant of Swiss and Alsatian families, particularly the de Pourtalès family.

Background 
Born in Munich, Stephanie zu Guttenberg is the only daughter of Andreas Graf von Bismarck-Schönhausen and Charlotte Kinberg, a Swedish interior architect with partial Dutch/German ancestry. She has two older half-siblings on her mother's side. Guttenberg grew up bilingual, and in addition to her native German and Swedish, she speaks English, French and Italian.

She attained a vocational certificate in textile engineering (Fashion Business Management) from the private academy Fachakademie für Textil & Schuhe in Nagold, and has worked during her schooling for several textile companies.

On 12 February 2000, she married Karl-Theodor zu Guttenberg, whom she had met when attending Love Parade in Berlin in 1995. They have two daughters, born in 2001 and 2002.

Activism 

In September 2010, she published the book Schaut nicht weg! Was wir gegen sexuellen Missbrauch tun müssen, co-written with Anne-Ev Ustorf.

She accompanied her husband when visiting the troops in Afghanistan in December 2010, which drew some criticism from the opposition.

Awards 
 2010: "Ehrenpreis für Kampf gegen Kindesmissbrauch", .

Publications 
 Stephanie zu Guttenberg, Anne-Ev Ustorf, Schaut nicht weg!, Verlag Kreuz, 2010,

Ancestry

References 

1976 births
Living people
People from Munich
German women writers
German activists
German baronesses
German countesses
German women activists
German people of Swedish descent
German people of Dutch descent
German people of Hungarian descent
German people of English descent
Stephanie
Bismarck family
Spouses of German politicians